Life of the Party is a musical with a book and lyrics by Alan Jay Lerner and music by Frederick Loewe.

The first of the team's many collaborations, it is a musical adaptation of Barry Connor's farce The Patsy. It was written for a Detroit stock theatre company. The play was performed in October 1942 at the Wilson Theatre, Detroit, and had a run of nine weeks, directed by  Russell Filmore and starring Dorothy Stone, Charles Collins, Charles Ruggles and Margaret Dumont. The musical was never staged on Broadway.

References

Lerner and Loewe at Hole in the Wall Books website

1942 musicals
Musicals based on plays
Musicals by Alan Jay Lerner
Musicals by Frederick Loewe